André Pinto may refer to:

André Pinto (footballer, born 1978), Brazilian footballer who played as a forward
André Pinto (footballer, born 1989), Portuguese footballer who plays as a defender
André Pinto (footballer, born 1994), Portuguese footballer who plays as a midfielder